"Faded" is a song by American rapper Tyga featuring Young Money-founder Lil Wayne. The song was first released on January 13, 2012 as the fourth single from the rapper's debut studio album, Careless World: Rise of the Last King (2012). For the chart dated May 27, 2012, "Faded" debuted at number 36 on the Billboard Hot 100 and peaked at number 33, marking Tyga's second highest-charting single  after "Rack City"; which peaked at number seven. It was released to US rhythmic radio stations on March 13, 2012. Complex named the song No. 42 of the best 50 songs of 2012.

Music video
The music video was released on March 31, 2012 on MTV Hits. The video features Lil Wayne and Tyga with big heads in a scene. Tyga sits on a throne and a bed full of models while rapping and a scene where he is in a box and along others too, similar to the opening to the American sitcom The Brady Bunch. Fellow YMCMB artists Birdman and Mack Maine make cameo appearances in the video.

Chart performance
The single debuted at number 36 on the Billboard Hot 100 chart and peaked at number 33. 
On May 23, 2014, the single was certified double platinum by the Recording Industry Association of America (RIAA) for sales of over two million units in the United States.

Charts

Weekly charts

Year-end charts

Certifications

References

2012 singles
2012 songs
Tyga songs
Lil Wayne songs
Cash Money Records singles
Music videos directed by Colin Tilley
Songs written by Lil Wayne
Songs written by Tyga
Dirty rap songs
Songs about drugs
Songs about alcohol